Eta Centauri, Latinized from η Centauri, is a star in the southern constellation of Centaurus.

The stellar classification of this star is B1.5 Vne, indicating that it is a B-type main sequence star. The 'n' suffix means that the absorption lines are broadened from rapid rotation and the 'e' that it shows emission lines in its spectrum. It has a projected rotational velocity of 330 km s−1 and completes a full rotation in less than a day.

As a Be star, it has variable emissions in its hydrogen spectral lines. This emission can be modelled by a decretion disk of gas that has been ejected from the star by its rapid rotation and now follows a near-Keplerian orbit around the central body. Its brightness is also slightly variable, and it is classified as a Gamma Cassiopeiae variable star with multiple periods of variability.  The International Variable Star Index lists Eta Centauri as both a Gamma Cassiopeiae variable and a Lambda Eridani variable with variations caused by its rotation and pulsations.

Eta Centauri has about 12 times the mass of the Sun, placing it above the dividing line between stars that evolve into white dwarfs and those that turn into supernovae. It is radiating 8,700 times the luminosity of the Sun from its outer atmosphere at an effective temperature of 25,700 K. At this temperature, the star glows with the blue-white hue common to B-type stars. Eta Centauri is a proper motion member of the Upper Centaurus–Lupus sub-group in the Scorpius–Centaurus OB association, the nearest such co-moving association of massive stars to the Sun.

References

External links 

Centaurus (constellation)
Centauri, Eta
Be stars
Gamma Cassiopeiae variable stars
B-type main-sequence stars
127972
Upper Centaurus Lupus
Lambda Eridani variables
071352
5440
Durchmusterung objects